Ustupo Airport  is a secondary airport serving the island town of Ustupo, Guna Yala comarca, Panama.

There are no regular flights from the airport. Air Panama flies to nearby Ogobsucum Airport.

See also

Transport in Panama
List of airports in Panama

References

External links
 OpenStreetMap - Ustupu Airport
 Great Circle Mapper - Ustupo
 FallingRain - Ustupo Airport
 

Airports in Panama
Guna Yala